Muhammad Sultan may refer to:

 Muhammad Sultan (1538–1610), Khan of Yarkent Khanate, 1592–1610
 Muhammad Sultan (Mughal prince) (1639–1676), a son of the Mughal Emperor Aurangzeb
 Muhammad Sultan Mirza (1365–1403), a grandson of the Central Asian conqueror Timur
 Mohammad Sultan (1926–1983), a Bangladeshi politician
 Mohammad Sultan (field hockey) (1918–1971), an Afghan field hockey player